Abrar Osman Adem (born 1 January 1994) is an Eritrean long-distance runner. At the 2012 Summer Olympics, he competed in the 5000 metres, finishing 11th overall in Round 1 and failing to qualify for the final.

International competitions

1Representing Africa

References

External links

 

Eritrean male long-distance runners
1994 births
Living people
Olympic athletes of Eritrea
Athletes (track and field) at the 2012 Summer Olympics
Athletes (track and field) at the 2010 Summer Youth Olympics
Athletes (track and field) at the 2015 African Games
Athletes (track and field) at the 2016 Summer Olympics
World Athletics Championships athletes for Ethiopia
Youth Olympic gold medalists for Eritrea
Youth Olympic gold medalists in athletics (track and field)
African Games competitors for Eritrea